The Pabst Brewing Company is an American company that dates its origins to a brewing company founded in 1844 by Jacob Best and was, by 1889, named after Frederick Pabst.  It is currently a holding company which contracts the brewing of over two dozen brands of beer and malt liquor: these include its own flagship Pabst Blue Ribbon, as well as brands from now defunct breweries including: 
P. Ballantine and Sons Brewing Company,
G. Heileman Brewing Company, 
Lone Star Brewing Company, 
Pearl Brewing Company,
 Piels Bros., 
 Valentin Blatz Brewing Company, 
National Brewing Company, 
Olympia Brewing Company, 
 Falstaff Brewing Corporation, 
Primo Brewing & Malting Company,
 Rainier Brewing Company, 
F & M Schaefer Brewing Company, 
Joseph Schlitz Brewing Company, 
Christian Schmidt Brewing Company,
Jacob Schmidt Brewing Company, and 
 Stroh Brewery Company. 
About half of the beer produced under Pabst's ownership is Pabst Blue Ribbon brand, with the other half their other owned brands.

The company is also responsible for the brewing of Ice Man Malt Liquor, St. Ides High Gravity Malt Liquor, and retail versions of beers from McSorley's Old Ale House and Southampton Publick House (of Southampton, New York).

Pabst is headquartered in San Antonio, Texas.

}}

Further reading
 Cochran, Thomas C. The Pabst Brewing Company: The History of An American Business. New York: New York University Press, 1948.
 Weiss, Jana. "Frederick Pabst" in William J. Hausman (ed.). Immigrant Entrepreneurship: German-American Business Biographies, 1720 to the Present. German Historical Institute, 2018.

External links

 Pabst Brewing Company
 History of Pabst Brewery 
 Paul Bialas Photography & Brewery Books, modern images of the dilapidated Schlitz and Pabts breweries.
 Olympia Beer: The Death of a Brand
 Old Style Beer: History
 Illustrated History of the Olympia Brewing Company
 Pabst Brewing Company and the 1893 World’s Columbian Exposition Urban Myth Debunked

 
1844 establishments in Wisconsin
American companies established in 1844
History of Milwaukee
Companies based in DuPage County, Illinois
Manufacturing companies based in Milwaukee